Mathias Sancassiani (January 5, 1907 – February 23, 1972) was a Luxembourgian boxer who competed in the 1928 Summer Olympics and in the 1936 Summer Olympics. He was born in Esch-sur-Alzette.

In 1928 he was eliminated in the second round of the lightweight class after losing his fight to Hans Jacob Nielsen. Eight years later he was eliminated in the second round of the welterweight class after losing his bout to Simplicio de Castro.

External links
Mathias Sancassiani's profile at the Luxembourg Olympic Committee
Mathias Sancassiani's profile at Sports Reference.com

1907 births
1972 deaths
Sportspeople from Esch-sur-Alzette
Luxembourgian male boxers
Lightweight boxers
Welterweight boxers
Olympic boxers of Luxembourg
Boxers at the 1928 Summer Olympics
Boxers at the 1936 Summer Olympics